"Paisley Park" is a 1985 song by Prince and The Revolution. It was the first single released in some international markets from their 1985 album, Around the World in a Day and so is also the album's last single internationally. "Paisley Park" was recorded 3 months after the  Purple Rain album was released. Violin on the song was played by Novi Novog, and Wendy & Lisa provide backing vocals. The rest of the song was performed by Prince. The song reached the Top 40 in all of the countries it was released in. It peaked within the Top 20 in both Ireland (No. 11) and the UK (No. 18).

"She's Always in My Hair"
The B-side of the single was "She's Always in My Hair", which was also on the U.S. release of "Raspberry Beret". Many copies of the 12" single were mis-pressed, featuring four tracks instead of the three mentioned on the sleeve ("She's Always In My Hair" being present twice). Basic tracking took place on December 29, 1983, in Studio 3 at Sunset Sound.

Track listings
7" single
A. "Paisley Park" – 4:41
B. "She's Always in My Hair" – 3:27

12" single
A1. "Paisley Park" – 4:41
A2. "She's Always in My Hair" – 3:27
B. "Paisley Park" (Remix) – 6:53

Personnel 

 Prince - all vocals and instruments
 Wendy Melvoin - backing vocals
 Lisa Coleman - backing vocals
 Novi Novog - violin

Charts

References

Prince (musician) songs
Songs written by Prince (musician)
1985 singles
1985 songs
Paisley Park Records singles
Warner Records singles
Song recordings produced by Prince (musician)